Manuel Sutter (born 8 March 1991) is an Austrian professional footballer who currently plays as a forward for FC Vaduz.

References

1991 births
Living people
Austrian footballers
Austria youth international footballers
FC St. Gallen players
FC Winterthur players
FC Vaduz players
Swiss Super League players
Swiss Challenge League players
Austrian expatriate footballers
Expatriate footballers in Switzerland
Austrian expatriate sportspeople in Switzerland
Expatriate footballers in Liechtenstein
Association football forwards
People from Bregenz
Footballers from Vorarlberg